Kathajodi River is an arm of the Mahanadi River in Odisha, India. It branches off at Naraj, then immediately is bifurcated. The southern branch, known as Kuakhai, which means Crow's pool, and flows into the Puri district. Its mouth is closed by a bar, so that little water flows into it except at flood times.

A little lower down from Cuttack the Kathajodi is bifurcated. The right branch is Sidhua and the left branch is Khatajodi. From flowing divide area 17 km the Khatajodi is merged with sidhua. The merge area is known as Odisha famous Dalei Ghai. The Kathajodi and the Sidhua create an island known as 42 Mouza. it is near about cuttack town just 2 km. Again the Kathajodi is bifurcated at Gobindpur, the right branch is known as the Devi and the left branch as the Biluakhai. Flowing in the northerly direction, the river Kathajodi again divides into the Alaka and Kathajodi proper, which have been cut off at their head by the Devi left embankment. The water originally carried by them has been diverted into the Devi. The river Kathajodi is said to have been originally a comparatively small stream. Its name implies that it could at one time be crossed by a plank of wood known as katha in Odia. During the last century the volume of water passing down its channel increased considerably and the head of the river became too large to carry off the enormous volume of water poured into it by Mahanadi. A weir and training embankments were, therefore constructed at Naraj between 1860 and 1865, in order to regulate the flow and direct some of the water to the Mahanadi channels.

During rains, the river and its branches carry great volume of water in them and at the time of high floods they overflow their banks. To safeguard people from the ravages of flood, embankments have been erected on their banks where necessary. All these villages are rich in ancient heritage. The people of these villages cultivate paddy and vegetables.

Some of the villages by the side of the Kathajodi River: Raghunathpur, Matagajapur, Mahura, etc. The famous Hansanath Temple dedicated to Lord Shiva is situated near Kathajodi River near Paramahansa famous for Jagar Yatra during Maha Shivaratri.

References 

Rivers of Odisha
Rivers of India